The 1879 Massachusetts gubernatorial election was held on November 4.

Republican nomination

Candidates
John Davis Long, Lieutenant Governor of Massachusetts
Henry L. Pierce, former Mayor of Boston and U.S. Representative

Declined
Thomas Talbot, incumbent Governor

Campaign
On June 20, Governor Talbot announced that he wished to retire at the end of his term and would decline the Republican nomination if offered. He formally withdrew on August 20.

Following Talbot's withdrawal, the field was divided between Lieutenant Governor John Davis Long and former Mayor of Boston Henry L. Pierce, with Pierce stronger in the cities.

Long (or his supporters) felt that he was guaranteed the nomination by agreement, having stepped aside for Talbot in 1878. However, this agreement quickly made way for the necessity of defeating Benjamin Butler, whom Republicans decried as a demagogue and communist. Supporters of Henry L. Pierce entered his name into consideration soon after Talbot's withdrawal in hopes that Long supporters would again concede to a stronger candidate, but they did not. Long and Pierce were in agreement on many issues, so the issue of electability decided the campaign. Pierce's supporters argued that he would better appeal to liberals, independents, and Democrats while Long had to rely on Stalwarts and prohibitionists. Though Long was conceded to be as liberal as Pierce, Pierce supporters argued that his brief public record was insufficient to appeal to swing constituencies.

Convention

Long formally accepted the nomination at a ratification meeting on September 26. Pierce sent a letter endorsing Long.

General election

Results
John Quincy Adams II, former State Representative from Quincy and nominee for Governor (1867–71) (Democratic)
Benjamin Butler, former U.S. Representative from Lowell (Greenback and Democratic)
 D.C. Eddy (Prohibition)
John Davis Long, Lieutenant Governor of Massachusetts (Republican)

See also
 1879 Massachusetts legislature

References

Governor
1879
Massachusetts
November 1879 events